An erotic photography model or erotic model poses for sensual or erotic photography which is used in exhibitions, art galleries, books, magazines, calendars, as well in other formats, mostly internet, DVDs and magazines. Erotic models pose in an explicit manner, rather than in artistic or implied styles where not everything is shown. The model can pose nude or wear lingerie, swimsuits, etc. No qualifications are required to work as an erotic model beyond being of legal age. The themes used in erotic photoshoots can be diverse, and it is up to the model and photographer to determine what the shoot will entail, so the model has to be aware of their limits.

See also
Fetish model
Nude photography
Fine-art photography
Glamour photography

Erotic photography
Modeling (profession)